Emamzadeh Varcheh (also Romanized as Emāmzādeh Varcheh; also known as Imāmzādeh Warcheh) is a village in Hamzehlu Rural District, in the Central District of Khomeyn County, Markazi Province, Iran. At the 2006 census, its population was 342, in 109 families.

References 

Populated places in Khomeyn County